QDA may refer to:

 Qualitative Data Analysis as used in qualitative research
 The .QDA extension is used for Quadruple D archives
 Quadratic discriminant analysis as used in statistical classification or as a quadratic classifier in machine learning